is a Japanese swimmer and former world record holder in the 200 metre breaststroke.

Career
He competed in the men's 100 metre breaststroke event at the 2016 Summer Olympics. On 9 August 2016, Watanabe broke the Olympic record for the men's 200 metre breaststroke event at the 2016 Summer Olympics during the semi-final. In the final, he finished 6th.

At the Kosuke Kitajima Cup in Tokyo he broke the long course 200 metre breaststroke world record in a time of 2:06.67. He is also the first swimmer ever to go under 2:07.

References

External links
 

1997 births
Living people
Olympic swimmers of Japan
Swimmers at the 2016 Summer Olympics
Swimmers at the 2014 Summer Youth Olympics
World record holders in swimming
World Aquatics Championships medalists in swimming
Asian Games medalists in swimming
Swimmers at the 2018 Asian Games
Medalists at the 2018 Asian Games
Asian Games silver medalists for Japan
Youth Olympic gold medalists for Japan
Japanese male breaststroke swimmers
21st-century Japanese people